The Man is a 2005 American buddy cop comedy film starring Eugene Levy, Samuel L. Jackson, and Miguel Ferrer.

The Man was directed by Les Mayfield and produced by Rob Fried, from a screenplay by Jim Piddock, Margaret Oberman and Stephen Carpenter, and based on a story by Piddock and Oberman. Filming took place in Toronto, Hamilton and Oakville, Ontario, Canada. New Line Cinema released The Man in Canada (through Alliance Atlantis) and the United States on September 9, 2005.

Plot 
Andy Fiddler is preparing a speech for a dental convention in Detroit. Fiddler works for a dental supply company, and lives in Milwaukee, Wisconsin. Meanwhile, in Detroit, a federal armory of the Bureau of Alcohol, Tobacco, Firearms and Explosives (ATF) has been robbed of assault rifles, handguns and ammunition. An ATF agent was killed and Internal Affairs agent Peters suspects the dead agent and his partner Agent Derrick Vann were in on the robbery.

After a visit to his informant Booty, Vann, attempting to clear his name, sets up a buy. He is to go to a diner and be reading a copy of the newspaper USA Today to be recognized. Unfortunately, Andy is also in the diner, and he has a copy of USA Today. He is mistaken for Vann. Joey, a menacing Englishman, sits next to Andy and hands him a paper bag with "his taste" in it then leaves. The bag contains a cell phone and a Walther P99 pistol, which Andy accidentally pulls out. The waitress of the diner thinks that Andy is there to rob the place and panics. An arriving Vann arrests Andy, before realizing the gun traffickers's error. The bag's cell phone rings and Vann answers. The caller is Joey, who wants the man who he thinks is Vann to drop $20,000 dollars in a certain trash can. Vann has the money, but now needs Andy to deliver it.

Due to the interference of a bystander, the location of the drop will change. Meanwhile, Andy tries to escape and Vann shoots after him, grazing him with a gunshot to the rear. Andy uses the cell phone to call the local police for help, resulting in the capture of both of them by arriving squad cars. The police releases Vann after learning that he is an ATF agent, but they discover there is an outstanding warrant for Andy. He reportedly only purchased a stolen rug without knowing of its origins, but he is still suspected of criminal activity.

Vann arranges the release of Andy, to use him in his case against the gun traffickers. Vann tries to contact gun dealer Manny Cortez for help with the case, but finds Manny murdered in his own house. Vann then receives a phone call from his ex-wife Dara, who reminds him about the upcoming dance recital of their daughter Kate. He then receives another phone call from Joey, who now asks for $500,000 for the whole batch of weapons. Vann has Andy pose as a powerful trafficker for a meeting with Joey in a restaurant. Andy improvises by returning the cell phone to Joey and telling him that their next meeting will be on his terms. Andy plans to use the next meeting to set up a trap for Joey. He then reminds Vann of his daughter's recital, and both men attend it.

Andy and Vann eventually arrange a meeting with Joey, but (against Andy's original plan) they fail to arrange backup from any law enforcement agency. Joey has never met Vann before and asks who he is. Andy claims that Vann is someone who will do anything they tell him. Vann admits this, and claims that he is betraying the service in pursuit of monetary gain. Joey is suitably convinced and agrees to work with him. Following the meeting, Andy and Vann part ways.

Andy stays in Detroit, delivers his speech and is then captured by agent Peters, who wants to use him against Vann. Peters claims that Vann is corrupt, that he is actually trying to buy the guns for himself. He also believes that Vann murdered Booty, Manny Cortez and his own partner. Peters wants Andy to wear a wire and get a confession out of Vann. Back at ATF offices, Vann is suspended, and his boss tells him that Andy was setting him up. Andy, now wired, visits Vann at his office. The two men drive to the exchange point to deliver the money. Vann suspects that Andy is wired and asks him about it. Andy admits it.

Vann and Andy enter the barn where the exchange is going to take place. This time Joey is skeptical of their motives and pulls a gun on Vann. The law enforcement agents hear everything through the wire, and soon arrive to arrest Joey. Andy manages to disarm Joey, though Vann still receives a bullet wound in the buttocks. Vann delivers Andy to the airport for his flight back to Milwaukee and the two men say goodbye. Vann accidentally sets off the metal detectors in the airport and blames it on Andy. The story ends with a protesting Andy being led away by airport security for a body cavity search.

Cast 
 Samuel L. Jackson as ATF Agent Derrick Vann
 Eugene Levy as Andy Fiddler
 Luke Goss as Joey Trent/Kane
 Miguel Ferrer as Agent Peters
 Susie Essman as Lt. Rita Carbone
 Anthony Mackie as Booty 
 Gigi Rice as Susan
 Rachael Crawford as Dara Vann
 Philip Akin as Second I.A. Agent 
 Lindsay Ames as Waitress
 Randy Butcher as Precinct Cop
 Michael Cameron as IA driver
 Kevin Rushton as Thug
 Joe Sacco as Rookie Cop
 Horatio Sanz as Santos
 Nestor Serrano as Manuel "Manny" Cortez
 Andrew Stelmack as Conventioneer
 Beatriz Yuste as Nun

Reception

Box office 
In its opening weekend, The Man earned $4,065,014 in 2,040 theaters. Altogether, the film was a box office bomb, only earning $8,330,720 in the United States and Canada and $12,382,362 worldwide. The DVD was released on January 10, 2006.

Critical response 
The Man has received negative reviews from critics, many of whom wrote that the plot made no sense and its jokes were rehashed. On review aggregator Rotten Tomatoes, the film holds a score of 12% based on 102 reviews. The site's consensus states: "Despite the steely presence of Samuel L. Jackson and the comic timing of Eugene Levy, The Mans plot is pointless and its jokes rehashed, as it ends up playing out like the Odd Couple with gas." On Metacritic, the film has a weighted average score of 33 out of 100, based on 27 reviews, indicating "generally unfavorable reviews".

The film received a Razzie nomination for Worst Supporting Actor (Eugene Levy). It also won the award for Less Than Dynamic Duo for Jackson and Levy at the 2005 Stinkers Bad Movie Awards.

References

External links 
 
 

2005 films
2000s crime comedy films
American buddy comedy films
American buddy cop films
American crime comedy films
2000s English-language films
Films scored by John Murphy (composer)
Films directed by Les Mayfield
Films set in Detroit
New Line Cinema films
Films shot in Hamilton, Ontario
Films shot in Toronto
2000s buddy cop films
2000s buddy comedy films
2005 comedy films
Bureau of Alcohol, Tobacco, Firearms and Explosives in fiction
2000s American films